Fenerbahçe Spor Kulübü (Fenerbahçe Sports Club) is a Turkish professional football club based in Istanbul, Turkey. They are the men's football department of Fenerbahçe SK, a major professional multi-sport club. Fenerbahçe, known informally as Fener, are one of the most successful and best supported football teams in Turkey, having never been relegated, and currently compete in the Turkish Super League, the Turkish Cup and UEFA Europa League.

They are nicknamed Sarı Kanaryalar (Turkish for "Yellow Canaries") and play their home games at Şükrü Saracoğlu Stadium, their own traditional home ground in Kadıköy, Istanbul. The club's name translates as "Lighthouse in the Garden" and comes from the Fenerbahçe neighbourhood of the Kadıköy district in Istanbul.

Fenerbahçe have won 19 Turkish Super League titles, 6 Turkish Cups and 9 Turkish Super Cups, among others. With 28 League titles in total (19 Super League, 6 National Division, and 3 former Turkish Football Championship titles) Fenerbahçe hold the record for most national championship titles won. The club also lead the all-time table of the Turkish Super League. 

In international club football, Fenerbahçe have won the Balkans Cup in 1968, which is marked as the first ever non-domestic trophy won by a Turkish football club. In UEFA competitions, Fenerbahçe have reached the quarter-finals in the 1963–64 UEFA Cup Winners' Cup and in the 2007–08 UEFA Champions League. The club's semi-final performance in the 2012–13 UEFA Europa League is marked as one of its greatest achievements in European competitions. Fenerbahçe are a member of the European Club Association.

They are one of the most popular clubs in Turkey, and the most popular in Istanbul and Ankara. Fenerbahçe have a large fanbase throughout the country, in Northern Cyprus, Azerbaijan, South Korea and in the Turkish diaspora. In their home at the Şükrü Saracoğlu Stadium, Fenerbahçe's average attendances have been among the highest in Turkey. Fenerbahçe's longest-running and deepest rivalry is with their nearest major neighbours, Galatasaray, with matches between the two being referred to as Intercontinental derby, being considered to be one of the fiercest and most intense derbies in the world. Matches against Beşiktaş are also derbys, but the rivalry is not as intense and fierce.

History

Early years 1907–1959

Fenerbahçe were founded in 1907 in Kadıköy, Istanbul, by local men Ziya Songülen, Ayetullah Bey and Necip Okaner. This group founded the club secretly in order to keep a low profile and not get into any trouble with the strict Ottoman rule, so strict that the Sultan Abdul Hamid II forbade the Turkish youth to set up a club or engage in the game of football played by the English families that was watched in envy. The three men came together and concluded that Kadıköy was in desperate need of its own football club, where locals would get a chance to practise the game of football. Ziya Songülen was elected the first president of the club, Ayetullah Bey became the first general secretary and Necip Okaner was given the post of general captain. 

The lighthouse situated on the Fenerbahçe cape was a big influence on the design of the club's first crest, which sported the yellow and white colors of daffodils around the lighthouse. The kits were also designed with yellow and white stripes. The crest of the club was changed in 1910 when Hikmet Topuzer redesigned the badge after Ziya Songülen had changed the colors to yellow and navy in the fall of 1909, still seen today. Fenerbahçe's activities were kept in secrecy until a legislation reform in 1908, when, under a new law, all football clubs had to register to exist legally.

The founding line-up included Ziya Songülen, Ayetullah Bey, Necip Okaner, Galip Kulaksızoğlu, Hassan Sami Kocamemi, Asaf Beşpınar, Enver Yetiker, Şevkati Hulusi Bey, Fuat Hüsnü Kayacan, Hamit Hüsnü Kayacan and Nasuhi Baydar.

Struggling with financial difficulties, Fenerbahçe joined the Istanbul Football League in 1909, finishing fifth in their first year. The first coach of the Fenerbahçe was Hüseyin Dalaklı, who was also the team's player. Fenerbahçe won the 1911–12 season of the Istanbul Football League without losing. This championship was the clubs first success in their long history. In the 1913–14 and 1914–15 seasons, the team under the coaching of Galip Kulaksızoğlu won the Istanbul Football League. Fenerbahçe finished the seasons 1920–21 and 1922–23 as champions in the Istanbul Friday League. Fenerbahçe completed the season with a score of 58–0 without losing or conceding goals in the season of 1922–23.

Fenerbahçe played against the staff of the Royal Navy that occupied Istanbul during the Turkish War of Independence. Some British soldiers formed football teams that were named after the players' speciality, for example Essex Engineers, Irish Guards, Grenadiers and Artillery. These teams played against each other and against local football teams in Istanbul. Fenerbahçe won many of these matches. The most known match played against the British was the match that would determine the winner of the General Harrington Cup. Fenerbahçe won the match held on 29 June 1923 at Taksim Stadium with two goals scored by Zeki Rıza Sporel, one of the important players of the period.

Fenerbahçe won the championship 6 times in 1937, 1940, 1943, 1945, 1946 and 1950, and became the team that achieved the most victories in the Turkish National Division. Lefter Küçükandonyadis, one of the important names of Fenerbahçe, scored 423 goals in 615 matches between 1947–1951 and 1953–64.

Fenerbahçe won the Istanbul Football League 16 times, the Turkish National Division 6 times, and the former Turkish Football Championship 3 times, all of them records, profiling themselves as forerunners and dominating side in Turkish football before the introduction of the professional nationwide league in 1959.

1959–1969 

The Turkish Football Federation founded a professional national league in 1959, which continues today under the name of the Süper Lig. Fenerbahçe won the first tournament, beating archrivals Galatasaray 4–1 on aggregate. The next year, Fenerbahçe participated in the European Cup for the first time. They qualified through a 4–3 win over Csepel SC, being the first Turkish club to advance to the next round by eliminating its opponent. They lost their first-round match to Nice 1–5 in a playoff game after drawing on aggregate. Fenerbahçe reached the quarter-final of the 1963–64 European Cup Winners' Cup where it was eliminated by MTK Budapest.

Fenerbahçe won four more league titles in the 1960s and were runners-up three times, making it the most successful club of that era. Fenerbahçe was coached by Ignác Molnár at the time, a famous Hungarian coach who had introduced a new style of football in Turkey. Under his guidance, Fenerbahçe managed to eliminate English champions Manchester City in the first round of the 1968–69 European Cup.

In the 1966–67 Balkans Cup (a competition set up for Eastern European clubs from Albania, Bulgaria, Greece, Romania, Turkey and Yugoslavia that existed between the 1960–61 and 1993–94 seasons), Fenerbahçe won the cup after three final matches against Greek club AEK Athens, making them the first Turkish club to win a non-domestic competition. This success would remain unparalleled by a Turkish club until Sarıyer and Samsunspor won the cup many years later in the 1990s, when the competition lost much of its popularity.

Later years 

The 1970s saw Fenerbahçe bring in the famous Didi as their new coach. Fenerbahçe won four more league titles, including a double with Cemil Turan being the top goal scorer three times. The 1970s also established a rivalry with Trabzonspor, where for almost a decade Fenerbahçe and Trabzonspor were competing with each other for the title. The 1980s saw Fenerbahçe win three more league titles. Under the guidance of Kálmán Mészöly, Fenerbahçe managed to eliminate French champions Bordeaux in the first round of the 1985–86 European Cup. This victory marked a turning point as for almost a decade no Turkish club managed to get past the first round in European competitions.

Galatasaray and Beşiktaş dominated the Turkish League during the 1990s, combining to win nine out of ten titles. Fenerbahçe's only Turkish League success during the 1990s came in the 1995–96 season under the guidance of Carlos Alberto Parreira. In the 1996–97 UEFA Champions League season, Fenerbahçe completed the group stage with seven points and, among others, defeated Manchester United 1–0 at Old Trafford, undoing the record of the English giants being unbeaten for 40 years in their homeground.

Fenerbahçe won the league title in 2001, denying Galatasaray a fifth consecutive title. It followed up the next season with a second-place behind Galatasaray with new coach Werner Lorant. However, the next season did not go so well as Fenerbahçe finished in sixth place. Despite this, that season is memorable to many Fenerbahçe fans due to a 6–0 win against arch-rivals Galatasaray at the Şükrü Saracoğlu Stadium on 6 November 2002. After firing Werner Lorant, the club hired another German coach, Christoph Daum. Daum had previously coached in Turkey, winning the league with Beşiktaş in 1994–95. Fenerbahçe brought in players including Pierre van Hooijdonk, Mehmet Aurélio and Fábio Luciano as a rebuilding process. These new players lead Fenerbahçe to its 15th title and third star (one being awarded for every five league titles won by a club).

The next year was followed by a narrow championship over Trabzonspor, winning a then record 16 Turkish Football League championships. Fenerbahçe lost the title in the last week of the 2005–06 season to Galatasaray. Fenerbahçe needed a win, but instead drew 1–1 with Denizlispor while Galatasaray won 3–0 over Kayserispor. Soon after, Christoph Daum resigned as manager and was replaced by Zico on 4 July 2006. Zico began his reign by signing two new defenders: highly touted Uruguayan international Diego Lugano and Zico's fellow Brazilian Edu Dracena. Zico also signed two strikers in Serbian international Mateja Kežman and another Brazilian, Deivid. Fenerbahçe's 2006–07 domestic season started with a 6–0 win over relegation candidates Kayseri Erciyesspor. In the 32nd week of the Süper Lig, Fenerbahçe drew Trabzonspor 2–2, while Beşiktaş lost to Bursaspor 0–3, putting the former out of contention for the title. Fenerbahçe won its 17th Süper Lig title in 2006–07.

2007–present 

On 11 January 2007, Fenerbahçe were officially invited to G-14. G-14 was an association which consists of top European clubs.

Under Zico's command, Fenerbahçe qualified from the 2007–08 Champions League group stage for the first time and went on to beat Sevilla to become a quarter-finalist in the 2007–08 season. Zico is also the most successful manager of the team's history in the Champions League. After successful scores both in the Turkish league and international matches, Zico gained a new nickname from the Fenerbahçe fans: Kral Arthur (meaning "King Arthur" in Turkish). In February 2009, Fenerbahçe became the first Turkish club to enter the Deloitte Football Money League. Since 2000, Fenerbahçe improved the club's finances and facilities, bringing world stars to the club such as Ariel Ortega, Pierre van Hooijdonk, Alex, Stephen Appiah, Nicolas Anelka and, more recently, Mateja Kežman, Roberto Carlos, Dani Güiza, Dirk Kuyt, Diego, Nani, Robin van Persie, and Mesut Özil.

In the 2009–10 season Fenerbahçe lost the title on the last matchday; Fenerbahçe players were told that a draw would be enough towards the end of the match only to find out that the other critical game went against their favour, as Bursaspor beat Beşiktaş 2–1 to win the title. Despite the title loss, Fenerbahçe ended the season with the most clean sheets (10), as well as the joint longest winning streak (8). In July 2011, Fenerbahçe fans invaded the pitch during a friendly against the Ukrainian champions Shakhtar Donetsk. As punishment, Fenerbahçe were sentenced to two Süper Lig games in an empty stadium. The TFF later allowed those two games to be filled with spectators; men were barred, while women and children under 12 were admitted for free. On 29 October 2012, Antalyaspor ended Fenerbahçe's 47-match unbeaten run in the Süper Lig at the Şükrü Saracoğlu Stadium. Fenerbahçe had not lost a match at home since they were beaten 2–3 by eventual champions Bursaspor in week 22, on 22 February 2010. Fenerbahçe won 38 and drew 9 in the 47 matches they played within 980 days since 22 February 2010. On 3 November 2012, Fenerbahçe pecked Akhisar Belediyespor to break a 181-day away jinx. On 2 May 2013, Fenerbahçe were eliminated by Benfica 3–2 on aggregate in the semi-final of the 2012–13 Europa League, one of the biggest successes in Fenerbahçe's history in UEFA competitions.

On 28 June 2013, Ersun Yanal agreed to take charge of Fenerbahçe to replace Aykut Kocaman, who resigned in late May. Ersun Yanal's appointment coincided with tough times for Fenerbahçe, who had just been banned from European competitions for two seasons over their alleged involvement in a domestic sports corruption scandal. Fenerbahçe, which finished second in the Süper Lig in 2012–13, thus missed-out on the 2013–14 Champions League, which it had been due to enter in the third qualifying round. Fenerbahçe finished the 2014–15 season as runners-up, forcing the board of directors to undertake some major changes. For the 2015–16 season, Fenerbahçe brought in Vítor Pereira as their new coach. Portuguese star Nani, Danish defender Simon Kjær and Robin van Persie were added to the squad to fulfill the club's ambitions to be successful in the Süper Lig and European competitions. On 10 December 2015, Fenerbahçe played their 200th European game against Celtic. On 12 October 2022, Fenerbahçe played their 250th European game against AEK Larnaca.

Former notable players 

When it was first founded in 1907, Fenerbahçe had a large squad. One of these players, Galip Kulaksızoğlu, was the longest serving player of the original squad, spending 17 years at the club, retiring in 1924 after 216 matches. Zeki Rıza Sporel and Bekir Refet, the first Turkish footballer ever to play abroad, were among the first products of the Fenerbahçe youth system. During his 18-year career with the club, Zeki Rıza scored 470 goals in 352 matches, or 1.3 goals every match, making him the all-time top scorer of Fenerbahçe. Zeki Rıza was also capped for the Turkish national team 16 times, scoring 15 goals. Cihat Arman became the first in a long-line of long-serving goalkeepers, playing 12 seasons and in 308 matches with the club.
Lefter Küçükandonyadis was one of the first Turkish football players to play in Europe. Lefter spent two seasons in Europe, playing for Fiorentina and Nice before returning to Fenerbahçe. All in all, Lefter scored 423 goals in 615 matches for the club, helping them to two Istanbul Football League titles and three Turkish League titles.

Another notable player, Can Bartu, became the next big Turkish export to Europe. He was also the first Turkish football player to play in a European competition final, doing so with Fiorentina against Atlético Madrid in 1962. Can also spent some seasons playing for Venezia and Lazio before returning to Fenerbahçe in 1967. He was a four-time league champion with Fenerbahçe and scored 162 goals in 330 matches. Some of the other most notable Turkish players who played for Fenerbahçe include: Fikret Arıcan, Fikret Kırcan, Halit Deringör, Melih Kotanca, Burhan Sargun, Nedim Doğan, Cemil Turan, Selçuk Yula, Müjdat Yetkiner, Oğuz Çetin, Rıdvan Dilmen, Aykut Kocaman, Rüştü Reçber and Tuncay Şanlı.

Former Romania goalkeeper Ilie Datcu was the first foreigner to reach 100 caps for Fenerbahçe. In recent decades, Fenerbahçe have gained an influx of foreigners who have helped the club to 19 Süper Lig titles. Among these include Uche Okechukwu, who after 13 seasons with Fenerbahçe and İstanbulspor became the longest serving foreigner in Turkey. During Uche's career with Fenerbahçe, he won two league titles and became a fan favourite. More recently, Fenerbahçe have been the home to Brazilian-born Mehmet Aurélio who, in 2006, became the first naturalized Turkish citizen to play for the Turkish national team.

Alex is another Brazilian player who scored the most goals of all foreign players who have played for Fenerbahçe. He managed to become top scorer of the Turkish Süper Lig on two occasions (in 2006–07 and 2010–11), Turkish Footballer of the Year twice (in 2005 and 2010), as well as assist leader in the 2007–08 season of the UEFA Champions League. Based on all those achievements, as well as his exemplary character and sportsmanship on and off the field, acknowledged by fans of Fenerbahçe and their rivals alike, he became the most successful and renowned foreign player to have ever played for the club and one of a few whose statue has been erected by the supporters of the club in the Yoğurtçu Park, in the near of Şükrü Saracoğlu Stadium. Some of the other foreign top players who played for Fenerbahçe over the years include: Toni Schumacher (1988–91), Jes Høgh (1995–99), Jay-Jay Okocha (1996–98), Elvir Bolić (1995–2000), Kennet Andersson (2000–02), Ariel Ortega (2002–03), Pierre van Hooijdonk (2003–05), Nicolas Anelka (2005–06), Stephen Appiah (2005–08), Mateja Kežman (2006–09), Diego Lugano (2006–11), Roberto Carlos (2007–09), Dirk Kuyt (2012–15), Robin van Persie (2015–2018) and Nani (2015–16).

Support 

Fenerbahçe have developed a strong following since their foundation in 1907. They are one of the most popular clubs in Turkey, with about 35% of the fans supporting them, and the most popular in Istanbul and Ankara. They have a large fanbase throughout the country, in Northern Cyprus, Azerbaijan and in the Turkish diaspora. Since the rebuilding of the Şükrü Saracoğlu Stadium, Fenerbahçe's average attendances have been among the highest in Turkey.

Fenerbahçe have several supporter organisations, including Genç Fenerbahçeliler (GFB), Kill For You (KFY), Antu/Fenerlist, EuroFeb (Fenerbahçe supporters in Europe), Group CK (Cefakâr Kanaryalar), 1907 ÜNİFEB, Vamos Bien, and SUADFEB. Many fanzines, blogs, podcasts, forums and fan websites have been dedicated to the club.

Relationships with other clubs 
More recently, in November 2011 Fenerbahçe's Genç Fenerbahçeliler created a friendly relationship with Torcida Sandžak, the organized supporters of Serbian club Novi Pazar. During a Süper Lig match against İstanbul Büyükşehir Belediyespor at the Şükrü Saraçoğlu Stadium, the Genç Fenerbahçeliler and 1907 Gençlik stand deployed a giant banner reading "Kalbimiz Seninle Novi Pazar" ("Novi Pazar, Our Hearts Are With You") and later, in the game against Radnicki Kragujevac in the Serbian SuperLiga, Torcida Sandžak members deployed a giant banner reading "Sancak'ta atıyor, Fenerbahçe'nin kalbi" ("The heart of Fenerbahçe beats in Sandžak").
On 2 March 2012, Fenerbahçe's Genç Fenerbahçeliler and 1907 Gençlik members were invited to Novi Pazar for the match against Partizan in the Serbian SuperLiga. Thousands of Torcida Sandžak members welcomed Genç Fenerbahçeliler and 1907 Gençlik's 17 members.

There is an informal friendship and fraternization between the fans of AEK and Fenerbahçe. In the 2017 Euroleague final, Fenerbahçe S.K. supporters displayed a banner which read "Same City's Sons"

Rivalries 

"The big three" clubs of Istanbul, Beşiktaş, Galatasaray and Fenerbahçe, have a century-long history of rivalry. The Fenerbahçe–Galatasaray rivalry is the primary Istanbul derby and the most important rivalry in Turkish football; matches between the two teams are known as The Intercontinental Derby. The rivalry started on 23 February 1934, when a friendly game between both clubs turned into a riot, forcing the match to be abandoned. The rivalry has led to violence among supporters on numerous occasions. Torches, smoke, flags, and giant posters are used to create visual grandeur and apply psychological pressure on visiting teams, which fans call "welcoming them to hell".

Stadium 

Fenerbahçe play their home matches at the Şükrü Saracoğlu Stadium, their own traditional home ground in the Kadıköy district of Istanbul, since 1908. Most recently renovated between 1999 and 2006, its capacity is 47,834. The club's museum has been situated in the stadium since 2005, after having been housed at a variety of locations. Before Şükrü Saracoğlu Stadium was built, the field was known as Papazın Çayırı ("The field of the priest"). The field, however, became the very first football pitch of Turkey, where the first league games of the Istanbul Football League were all held successively. In 1908, local teams of the league needed a regular football field, so this land was leased from the Ottoman Sultan Abdul Hamid II for 30 Ottoman gold pounds a year. The total construction cost was 3,000 Ottoman gold pounds. The name was changed to the Union Club Field after the club which made the highest donation for the construction.

The Union Club Field was used by many teams in İstanbul, including the owner, Union Club (which changed its name to İttihatspor after World War I), Fenerbahçe, Galatasaray, and Beşiktaş. However, it had lost its importance when a bigger venue, the Taksim Stadium, was built in 1922, inside the courtyard of the historic Taksim Topçu Kışlası (Taksim Artillery Barracks), which was located at the present-day Taksim Gezi Parkı (Taksim Park). İttihatspor (which had close relations with the political İttihat ve Terakki), was forced to sell it to the state, in which Şükrü Saracoğlu was a member of the CHP government. Thus, the ownership of the stadium passed to the state, but the field was immediately leased to Fenerbahçe.

Later, on 27 May 1933, Fenerbahçe purchased the stadium from the government when Şükrü Saracoğlu was the president of Fenerbahçe, for either the symbolic amount of 1 TL or the worth of the stadium which was 9,000 TL. The name of the field was changed to Fenerbahçe Stadium, and this made Fenerbahçe the first football club in Turkey to own their stadium, with the help of the government. In the following years, Fenerbahçe renovated the stadium and increased its seating capacity. By 1949, Fenerbihç Stadium was the largest football venue in Turkey, with a seating capacity of 25,000. The name of the stadium was changed once more in 1998, becoming Fenerbahçe Şükrü Saracoğlu Stadium, named after Fenerbahçe's president and Turkey's fifth Prime Minister, Şükrü Saracoğlu. In 1999, the latest round of renovations and capacity increasing projects started. The tribunes on the four sides of the stadium were torn down one at a time, as the Turkish Super League seasons progressed, and the entire renewal and construction project was finalised in 2006, with the efforts of Fenerbahçe president Aziz Yıldırım and the team's board of directors.

Club crest and colours 

Since the club's foundation, Fenerbahçe have used the same badge, which has only undergone minor alterations. It was designed by Hikmet Topuzer, nicknamed Topuz Hikmet, who played as a right winger, in 1910, and had made as lapel pins by Tevfik Haccar Taşçı in London. The crest consists of five colours. The white section which includes the writing Fenerbahçe Spor Kulübü ★ 1907 ★ represents purity and open-heartedness, the red section represents love and attachment to the club and symbolises the Turkish flag. The yellow section symbolises other ones' envy and jealousy about Fenerbahçe, while the navy symbolises nobility. The oak leaf which rises from the navy and yellow section shows the force and the power of being a member of Fenerbahçe. The green colour of the leaf shows that the success of Fenerbahçe is imperative. Hikmet Topuzer describes the story of the emblem as below:

Shirt sponsors and manufacturers 

1 European Shirt sponsor

Five star controversy 

Prior to the beginning of the 2022–2023 Süper Lig season, Fenerbahçe S.K. announced that it would be count all league titles won by the club before the inaugural 1959 Süper Lig season (then known as the Turkish Football League), where games where played in the Istanbul Football League. This would mean that the club had 28 league championships, rather than their recognised 19. In compliance with this, the club president Ali Koç announced that the club would be adding two more stars onto their crest due to the Süper Lig star rating system. Thus far the governing football body in Turkey, the TFF, have not recognised this action and have threatened the club with a fine. beIN Sports have denied live coverage of interviews with the five star crest displayed, citing that it's legalities with the TFF would not make way for this to happen. Rival clubs such as Galatasaray S.K. have condemned this action and reported it to the TFF. Regardless, the club continue to use their 5 star crest in their stadium, social media and team merchandise while official sources and other teams remain with the UEFA recognised three star crest.

Honours

Domestic competitions

National Championships – 28 (record)
 Turkish Super League
 Winners (19): 1959, 1960–61, 1963–64, 1964–65, 1967–68, 1969–70, 1973–74, 1974–75, 1977–78, 1982–83, 1984–85, 1988–89, 1995–96, 2000–01, 2003–04, 2004–05, 2006–07, 2010–11, 2013–14
 Runners-up (23): 1959–60, 1961–62, 1966–67, 1970–71, 1972–73, 1975–76, 1976–77, 1979–80, 1983–84, 1989–90, 1991–92, 1993–94, 1997–98, 2001–02, 2005–06, 2007–08, 2009–10, 2011–12, 2012–13, 2014–15, 2015–16, 2017–18, 2021–22

 Turkish National Division
 Winners (6) (record): 1937, 1940, 1943, 1945, 1946, 1950
 Runners-up (2): 1944, 1947

 Turkish Football Championship
 Winners (3) (shared-record): 1933, 1935, 1944
 Runners-up (2): 1940, 1947

National Cups - 25
 Turkish Cup
 Winners (6): 1967–68, 1973–74, 1978–79, 1982–83, 2011–12, 2012–13
 Runners-up (11): 1962–63, 1964–65, 1988–89, 1995–96, 2000–01, 2004–05, 2005–06, 2008–09, 2009–10, 2015–16, 2017–18

 Turkish Super Cup
 Winners (9): 1968, 1973, 1975, 1984, 1985, 1990, 2007, 2009, 2014
 Runners-up (9): 1970, 1974, 1978, 1979, 1983, 1989, 1996, 2012, 2013

 Prime Minister's Cup 
 Winners (8) (record): 1945, 1946, 1950, 1973, 1980, 1989, 1993, 1998
 Runners-up (7): 1944, 1971, 1976, 1977, 1992, 1994, 1995

 Spor Toto Cup 
 Winners (1): 1967

 Atatürk Cup 
 Winners (1): 1998

European competitions
 Balkans Cup
 Winners (1): 1966–67

Regional competitions

 Istanbul Football League 
 Winners (16) (record): 1911–12, 1913–14, 1914–15, 1920–21, 1922–23, 1929–30, 1932–33, 1934–35, 1935–36, 1936–37, 1943–44, 1946–47, 1947–48, 1952–53, 1956–57, 1958–59
 Istanbul Cup
 Winners (1): 1945
 Istanbul Shield
 Winners (4) (record): 1930, 1934, 1938, 1939

Other
 General Harrington Cup
 Winners (1): 1923

 Fleet Cup 
 Winners (4) (record): 1982, 1983, 1984, 1985

 TSYD Cup 
 Winners (12) (shared-record): 1969, 1973, 1975, 1976, 1978, 1979, 1980, 1982, 1985, 1986, 1994, 1995

 TSYD Challenge Cup 
 Winners (2) (record): 1976, 1980

 Atatürk Cup 
 Winners (1): 1964

European record

Best achievements

Statistics of UEFA competitions 

Source: UEFA.comPld = Matches played; W = Matches won; D = Matches drawn; L = Matches lost; GF = Goals for; GA = Goals against; GD = Goal Difference.

UEFA club coefficient ranking

Statistics of Non-UEFA competition 

Pld = Matches played; W = Matches won; D = Matches drawn; L = Matches lost; GF = Goals for; GA = Goals against; GD = Goal Difference.

Players

Current squad 
.

Academy players training with the main squad 
.

Unregistered players under contract

Out on loan

Academy teams

Retired number(s) 

 12, representing the supporters of the club

Team captains

Records

Past seasons

Most

Fewest

Player records

Most goals 

Note: Zeki Rıza Sporel scored his record eight goals against Anadolu in 1931, Melih Kotanca repeated this record against Topkapı in 1940. Tanju Çolak scored six goals against Karşıyaka in the 1992–93 season.

Most appearances

Club officials

Board members 

Source:

Technical staff 

Source:

Fenerbahçe as a company 
The company had a negative equity of 424,317,388 Turkish lire; total assets of 311,233,179 lire; revenue 317,610,262 lire and a net loss of 181,234,264 in the 2014–15 season. The club was required to have an aggregate break-even in 2019 (2016–17, 2017–18 and 2018–19 season), and more specifically a maximum annual net loss of €30 million, €20 million and €10 million in 2015–16, 2016–17 and 2017–18 seasons. Turkish clubs Beşiktaş, Kardemir Karabükspor and Trabzonspor (twice) also entered into settlement agreements in 2014, 2015 and 2016, with Bursaspor and Galatasaray being banned from European football in 2015 and 2016 respectively due to breaching overdue payable and the settlement agreement respectively.

Trivia 
 Fenerbahçe went through the 1922–23 season of the Istanbul Football League undefeated without conceding a single goal.
 First Turkish club to win a non-domestic trophy (Balkans Cup in 1968)
 All-time best in Turkish League cumulative standings with the highest number of wins and the fewest losses as well as the most scoring football team in history.
 Best winning percentage in a season:
 29 wins and 6 draws in 36 matches, 0.888 in the 1988–89 season
 Best group stage finish for a Turkish club in the Europa League:
 15 points in 6 games against  Twente,  Sheriff Tiraspol and  Steaua București, in the 2009–10 season
 In the 1988–89 season, Fenerbahçe set a record that is hard to break by reaching the championship with 103 goals scored in 36 matches of the regular season.

See also 
 Fenerbahçe S.K.
 Fenerbahçe Women's Football
 Fenerbahçe Basketball
 Fenerbahçe Women's Basketball
 Fenerbahçe Men's Volleyball
 Fenerbahçe Women's Volleyball
 List of unrelegated association football clubs

Footnotes

References 

Sources

External links 
 

  
 Official website of 1907 Fenerbahçe Association 

 
Football
Association football clubs established in 1907
Football clubs in Istanbul
Sport in Kadıköy
1907 establishments in the Ottoman Empire
Unrelegated association football clubs
Companies listed on the Istanbul Stock Exchange
Süper Lig clubs
Sports teams in Istanbul